The Stella Adler Studio of Acting (formerly Stella Adler Conservatory) is a prestigious acting school that was founded by actress and teacher Stella Adler. The Stella Adler Studio of Acting has two locations: its original New York City conservatory, founded in 1949, and the Art of Acting Studio in Los Angeles. The Stella Adler Studio of Acting in New York is not affiliated with the Stella Adler Academy & Theatre, which Adler established in Los Angeles in 1985. The Stella Adler Studio and the Juilliard School currently boast the lowest program acceptance rates in the professional acting world. The studio only accepts sixteen students a semester into its professional conservatory program.

History

Background and approach
Concurrent with her work as an actor and director, Stella Adler began to teach in the early 1940s at the Erwin Piscator Workshop at the New School for Social Research in New York. She left the faculty in 1949 to establish her own studio in New York in the same year.

Combining what she had learned from the Yiddish theatre, the Group Theatre, Broadway, Hollywood, and Constantin Stanislavski, Stella created the Stella Adler Theatre Studio, later renamed the Stella Adler Conservatory of Acting and more recently the Stella Adler Studio of Acting, where she taught acting for many decades, and in 1985, she opened the Stella Adler Academy and Theatre in Los Angeles.

The studio offered courses in principles of acting, voice and speech, Shakespeare, movement, and makeup, as well as workshops in play analysis, character, scene preparation, and acting styles. Onstage experience was acquired by performances of scenes and plays before an invited audience. Among her early students were Marlon Brando,  Robert De Niro, Warren Beatty, Elaine Stritch, Mario Van Peebles, Harvey Keitel, and Candice Bergen.

Adler's grandson Tom Oppenheim, who runs the Stella Adler Studio of Acting in New York and the Art of Acting Studio in Los Angeles, summarizes her approach to acting as such: "Growth as an actor and growth as a human being are synonymous."

Establishment in New York
 
The Stella Adler Studio of Acting, in New York City, was founded in 1949 by Adler. In 1969, it became the first professional training school to become affiliated with New York University's Tisch School of the Arts. The studio became a 501(c)3 not-for-profit organization in 2000. The mission of the Stella Adler Studio of Acting is to create an environment with the purpose of nurturing theatre artists who value humanity, their own and others, as their first and most precious priority while providing art and education to the greater community.

The Stella Adler Studio of Acting official West Coast branch is the Art of Acting Studio Los Angeles, named after Stella Adler's most famous book.  The Stella Adler Studio of Acting is not affiliated with the Stella Adler Academy in Los Angeles.

Los Angeles studio
Adler's long history with Hollywood meant she had close ties and strong connections in the Los Angeles area. She taught for many years at various locations in Los Angeles, and longtime friend and protégé Joanne Linville and she eventually opened the doors to the Stella Adler Conservatory of Acting at the corner of Hollywood Boulevard and Argyle. Some of the notable people who have passed through the Hollywood conservatory include Nick Nolte, Salma Hayek, Eric Stoltz, Deidre Hall, Sean Astin, John Charles Jopson, John Ritter, Herschel Savage, Cybill Shepherd, Michael Richards, Benicio del Toro, and Mark Ruffalo.

Protégés Joanne Linville and Irene Gilbert persuaded Stella Adler to open the academy in 1985 in Los Angeles. Together, Gilbert and Linville are considered the school's cofounders, with Adler granting them permission to use her name. Gilbert  remained the director of the school for 20 years.

The original school was located in a small theater at Hollywood Boulevard and Argyle Avenue. A fire forced the temporary closure of the school in 1991. The building was threatened with demolition to make way for a proposed subway line at the time of Adler's death in 1992. In 1994, Irene Gilbert reopened the school's present location at 6773 Hollywood Boulevard and Highland Avenue. It was renamed the Stella Adler Academy of Acting, and  celebrated its 25th anniversary in 2010. The historic location housed the famous Embassy Club in the 1930s.

The school is an acting studio offering extensive training for actors in theatre, film, and television. The facility houses the not-for-profit Stella Adler Theatre, the Irene Gilbert Theatre, The Studio C Theatre, classrooms, dance studio, music studio, library, dressing rooms, video and equipment room, scene shop, and administrative offices, all dedicated to teaching Stella's technique.

Linville continues to teach at the academy as the lead instructor for the last 25 years. Irene Gilbert died in 2011.

In 2010, alumni of the school formed the Stella Adler Los Angeles Theatre Collective.

Notable alumni

 Sean Astin
Warren Beatty
 Byrdie Bell
 Candice Bergen
 Peter Bogdanovich
 Marlon Brando
 Alden Ehrenreich
 Mark Ruffalo
 James Coburn
 Clifton Collins, Jr.
Bud Cort
 Robert De Niro
 Benicio del Toro
 Leah Dizon
 Lilly Englert
 Maya Eshet
 Wayne Federman
 Nina Foch
 Teri Garr
 Valeria Gastaldi 
 Pamela Gidley
 Alexander Godunov
 Melanie Griffith
Christopher Guest
 Jean Hale
 Dennis W. Hall
 Salma Hayek
 Jessica Hecht
Bryce Dallas Howard
 John Charles Jopson
Ruman Kazi
 Harvey Keitel
Sally Kellerman
Perry King
 Bianca Lawson
Cloris Leachman
 Natasha Leggero
 Jane Levy
 Karl Malden
 Thuso Mbedu
 Rafael Morais
 Sergej Moya
 Donna Murphy
 Kate Mulgrew
 Adam Nagaitis
 Judd Nelson
 Nick Nolte
 Bill Paxton
 Sydney Tamiia Poitier
 Sydney Pollack
 Anthony Quinn
 Eva Marie Saint
 John Saxon
 Herschel Savage
 Martin Sheen
Cybill Shepherd
 Maya Shoef
 Darrell M. Smith
 Elaine Stritch
 Holland Taylor
 Christopher Thornton
 Nitya Vidyasagar
 Henry Winkler

See also
Stella Adler
Actors Studio

References

External links
 Stella Adler Studio of Acting, New York City, Official website
 Art of Acting Studio, Los Angeles, Official Website
 Stella Adler Academy of Acting, LA, Official website

Drama schools in the United States
Performing arts education in New York City
Educational institutions established in 1949
Education in Los Angeles
 
1949 establishments in New York City